Karin Roßley, (née Regel, born 5 April 1957) is a retired East German hurdler, who represented the sports team SC Cottbus. She was born in Cottbus.

She won the bronze medal at the 1978 European Championships.

Roßley set two world records during her career: 55.63 seconds in August 1977 in Helsinki and 54.28 seconds in May 1980 in Jena. The latter stood for three years until Anna Ambrazienė ran in 54.02 seconds in Moscow. Karin Roßley's personal best time remained at was 54.28 seconds, a result which ranks her eighth among German 400 m hurdlers, behind Sabine Busch, Cornelia Ullrich, Ellen Fiedler, Heike Meissner, Gudrun Abt, Silvia Rieger and Susanne Losch.

References

1957 births
Living people
Sportspeople from Cottbus
People from Bezirk Cottbus
East German female hurdlers
World record setters in athletics (track and field)
European Athletics Championships medalists